Yunnanilus cruciatus is a species of stone loach endemic to Vietnam.  This species grows to a length of  SL.  It is sometimes placed in the putative monotypic genus Micronemacheilus but this genus is currently preoccupied by Micronemacheilus zispi, although this species is regarded by some authorities as a junior synonym of Traccatichthys taeniatus. Y. cruciatus occurs in the relatively still and shallow stretches of rivers where there is dense aquatic vegetation and the substrate is muddy and sandy. The species seems to be quite commonly found in the aquarium trade.

Footnotes 

cruciatus
Taxa named by Carl Hialmar Rendahl
Fish described in 1944